Marinakis is a surname. Notable people with the surname include:

Evangelos Marinakis (born 1967), Greek shipowner
Miltiadis Marinakis (1930-1999), Greek shipowner and politician, father of Evangelos
Nikos Marinakis (born 1993), Greek professional footballer 

Greek-language surnames
Surnames